The Dwars Kill (also known as Dwarskill or Dwarskill Creek) is a tributary of the Hackensack River (Oradell Reservoir) in Bergen County, New Jersey, in the United States. The name is taken from the Dutch language and can be translated as "Cross Creek".

See also
List of rivers of New Jersey

References

Closter, New Jersey
Rivers of Bergen County, New Jersey
Hackensack River
Rivers of New Jersey